Concept is the seventeenth studio album by the reggae artist Beenie Man.

Track listing
 "Do Supmmm..." - 4:06
 "Concept of Life" - 3:51
 "Love You" - 4:05
 "Settle Down" (featuring Gringo) - 3:27
 "Hot" (featuring Spice) - 5:04
 "Sign Me Up" - 3:21
 "Politrix" - 3:33
 "One Pound a Day" (featuring Cornel Campbell & John Holt) - 4:06
 "Imagination" (featuring Devonte) - 3:50
 "Be a Friend" (featuring Ghost) - 3:22
 "No Promise" - 3:23
 "Nah Resign" - 3:20
 "God Black" - 3:30
 "From Birth" (featuring Zahair) - 4:07

References 

Beenie Man albums
2006 albums